Hafez-e Abru (died June 1430) was a Persian historian working at the courts of Timurid rulers of Central Asia. His full name is 
ʿAbdallah (or Nur-Allah) Ebn Lotf-Allah Ebn 'Abd-al-Rashid Behdadini; his short name is also transcribed in Western literature as Hafiz-i Abru, Hafez-e Abru, Hafiz Abru etc.

Hafiz-i Abru was born in Khorasan and studied in Hamadān. He entered Timur's court in the 1380s; after the death of Timur, Hafiz-i Abru continued in the service of Timur's son, Shah Rukh, in Herat. He interacted with other scholars congregating around Timur's and Shah Rukh's courts, and became recognized as a good chess player.

Hafiz-i Abru is the author and/or compiler of numerous works on the history and geography of the Timurid state and adjacent regions, commissioned by his master Shah Rukh, in particular Majma al-tawarikh ("World Histories").

References

Sources

15th-century Iranian historians
14th-century Iranian historians
Historians from the Timurid Empire
Officials of the Timurid Empire